A statue of U.S. President Donald Trump was erected on private land in Sela pri Kamniku, Slovenia, in 2019. The approximately  wood monument depicted Trump wearing a blue suit and a red tie, with a fierce expression and his right arm raised in a fist. A mechanism inside the statue allowed the mouth to open, revealing sharp teeth. Tomaz Schlegl, the artist behind the project, said that "Like all populists, the statue has two faces."

The artist intended the statue as "a provocation, because the world is full of populism". Former Slovenian member of parliament Igor Omerza thought it could be seen as a sign of the country's "love-hate" relationship with President Trump, depicting either the raised hand of the Statue of Liberty or the iron fist of a populist dictator.

After complaints from residents, the statue was relocated to Moravče. It was vandalised with the addition of a Hitler moustache, and later burned to the ground by unknown arsonists.

See also

 2019 in art
 Statue of Melania Trump
 The Emperor Has No Balls

References

2019 establishments in Slovenia
2019 sculptures
2019 in politics
Monuments and memorials in Slovenia
Outdoor sculptures
Parodies of Donald Trump
Political art
Sculptures of men
Statues in Slovenia
Statues of Donald Trump
Wooden sculptures
Destroyed sculptures